Wila Willk'i (Aymara wila blood, red, willk'i gap, "red gap", also spelled Wila Villque) is a  mountain in the Andes of Bolivia. It is located in the Oruro Department, Challapata Province, Challapata Municipality. Wila Willk'i lies northeast of Chullpa Chullpani. It is north of the Qala Jawira ("stone river", Hispanicized spelling Khala Jahuira), an affluent of the Crucero River.

References 

Mountains of Oruro Department